Meandropsinidae is an extinct family of miliolid forams found in Upper Cretaceous (Cenomanian) to middle Paleocene marine sediments.

Tests, or shells, are multi-chambered with complex interiors, composed of porcelaineous  calcite and variable in form, including discoidal, conical, and cylindrical. Apertures are multiple, in one or more rows.

Genera 
Genera included in Meandropsinidae:

 †Alexina Hottinger & Caus, 2009 
 †Ayalaina Seiglie, 1961  
 †Eofallotia Hottinger & Caus, 2009  
 †Fallotia Douvillé, 1902  
 †Fascispira A. Silvestri, 1940  
 †Hottingerina Drobne, 1975  
 †Larrazetia Ciry, 1964  
 †Meandropsina Munier-Chalmas, 1898  
 †Nummofallotia Barrier & Neumann, 1959  
 †Pastrikella Cherchi, Radoičić & Schroeder, 1976  
 †Perouvianella G. Bizon, J.J. Bizon, Fourcade & Vachard, 1975  
 †Pseudobroeckinella Deloffre & Hamaoui, 1969  
 †Raoia Matsumaru & Sarma, 2010  
 †Spirapertolina Ciry, 1964

References

Further reading 
Alfred R. Loeblich, jr & Helen Tappan 1964. Sarcodina, Chiefly "Thecamoebians" and Foraminiferida.   Treatise on Invertebrate Paleontology, Part C, Protista 2.  Geological Society of America and University of Kansas Press. 
 Meandropsinidae in GSI.ir Paleontology,  
 Miliolida in Foraminifera Morphological Classification 

Foraminifera families
Prehistoric SAR supergroup families